Mthokozisi Cyprial 'Zee' Mkhabela (born 15 October 1994) is a South African rugby union player for the  in the Super Rugby and the  in the Rugby Challenge. His regular position is scrum-half. 

He recently signed for Spanish Club Valladoid for the 21/22 season, having previously played for his Local side College Rovers.

Career

KwaZulu-Natal (2010–12)

In 2010, Mkhabela was called up to represent KwaZulu-Natal at the Under-16 Grant Khomo Week tournament held in Upington. The following year, he was selected in a South African Academy team that played against a France Under-18 team in Durban and in 2012, he represented KwaZulu-Natal at the premier South African schools competition, the Under-18 Craven Week.

Free State Cheetahs / UFS Shimlas / South Africa Under-20 (2013–)

After high school, Mkhabela moved to Bloemfontein to join the  prior to the 2013 season. He made ten appearances for the  team, scoring a try in their match against the s.

In 2014, Mkhabela was selected for the South Africa Under-20 squad that participated in the 2014 IRB Junior World Championship in New Zealand. He started the first match of the competition, a 61–5 victory over Scotland, but was an unused replacement in their other two pool stage matches against New Zealand and Samoa. He was again named on the bench for their semi-final win over New Zealand without getting any game time, as well as in the final against England, where South Africa suffered a 20–21 defeat.

Mkhabela got more game time upon his return to domestic action, playing eleven times in the s' 2014 Under-21 Provincial Championship season, helping them qualify for the semi-finals, where they lost to eventual losing finalists .

In 2015, Mkhabela was included in the  squad for the 2015 Varsity Cup. He made seven appearances for the Shimlas pool stages of the tournament as Shimlas finished second on the log, but missed out on the play-offs as Shimlas won the competition for the first time, beating  63–33 in the final. After the tournament, Mkhabela was named as the replacement scrum-half in a Varsity Cup Dream Team that played a match against the 2015 South African Under-20 squad, with the latter winning the match 31–24.

References

South African rugby union players
Living people
1994 births
People from Empangeni
Rugby union scrum-halves
Free State Cheetahs players
South Africa Under-20 international rugby union players
Cheetahs (rugby union) players
Sharks (Currie Cup) players
Sharks (rugby union) players
Rugby union players from KwaZulu-Natal